Capharnaum was an American technical death metal band from Sanford, Florida, formed by brothers Jason and Jordan Suecof.

History
Capharnaum was founded in 1993 by Jason and Jordan Suecof, who are the only continuous members of the band. The band was originally from Avon, Connecticut but moved to Sanford, Florida after their breakup in 1999. In 1997, the band released their debut album, Reality Only Fantasized. A year later, they recorded the Plague of Spirits demo. In 2004, they released Fractured, which was recorded at Jason Suecof's Audio Hammer Studios, on Willowtip Records.

Members
Last lineup
 Jason Suecof – guitars (1993–1999, 2003–2009)
 Jordan Suecof – drums (1993–1999, 2003–2009)
 Mike Poggione – bass (2003–2009)
 Matt Heafy – vocals (2003–2009)
 Alex Vieira – guitars (2004–2009)

Former members
 Frank Vega – vocals (1993–1995)
 Tony Espinoza – vocals (1995–1999)
 Ryan Adams – guitars (1995–1997)
 Daniel Mongrain – guitars (2003–2004)
 Andy Dickins – bass (1993–1997)
 Shawn Greenlaw – bass (1997–1999)
 Kevin Schremmer – guitars (1997–1999)

Discography
Studio Albums
 Reality Only Fantasized (1997)
 Fractured (2004)

Demo
Plague of Spirits (1999)

References

1993 establishments in Florida
American technical death metal musical groups
Earache Records artists
Musical groups established in 1993
Musical groups from Florida
Musical quintets
Technical death metal musical groups